Small Cooks is an islet in Palmerston Island in the Cook Islands. It is on the eastern side of the atoll, between Leicester and Karakerake. Its name is a reference to Cooks, another islet on the atoll.

References

Palmerston Island